Louis de Boullogne II (19 November 1654 – 2 November 1733), known as Boullogne fils, was a French painter.

Life
Boullogne was born and died in Paris, and was the brother of Bon Boullogne. Their father, Louis Boullogne, feared rivalry between the two brothers if Louis the younger became a painter and so at first opposed his wish to do so. However, his vocation finally won through and every evening Louis crossed Paris to go with Bon to draw at the Académie. Aged 18 he won the grand prix de peinture and left for Rome in 1676, when his brother returned from there. He made copies after The School of Athens, Disputation of the Holy Sacrament and many other works by Raphael, from which the Gobelins made many different tapestries for the French king.

Returning through Lombardy and Venice in 1680, Louis returned to Paris and soon won a great reputation. In 1681 he was received as a member of the Académie : his reception piece showed Augustus closing the doors to the temple of Janus, after the battle of Actium. On 3 February 1688 he married Marguerite Bacquet. In 1722, he was chosen to design the medals and mottos for the Académie des inscriptions, receiving a new 1,000 livres pension and the ordre de Saint-Michel. In 1723, he was made rector of the Académie; in 1724, first painter to the king, with letters patent of nobility for him and his descendants; and, in 1725, director of the Académie, offices he held until his death. His students included , Louis Galloche and Jacques-François Courtin. A strong supporter of the Académie, Louis de Boullogne supported its students with his lessons and his protection. He was the sworn enemy of the pochades and bambochades, claiming that only those with great skill and a fully formed taste could be allowed to paint.

Louis Boullogne was buried at Saint-Eustache, parish of his birth. He left a vast fortune to four children he had had with Bacquet - two sons (the eldest was councilor to the parlement de Metz, then conseiller d'État and an intendant des finances et ordres du roi, and the younger receiver general of finances for Tours) and two daughters (of which one married Jean-Pierre Richarol, receiver general of finances, with whom she had the painter Jean-Claude Richard, and the other became a nun). Jacques François Courtin was his pupil.

Works
In general, his compositions displayed a firm understanding of mise en scène, with a firm touch and striking colors. His heads display a great deal of expression and character and his talents were suited to easel paintings as well as large murals. His drawings are in black chalk, on white, blue or gray paper, with some slight hatching. In some, the features are fixed and the shadows are faded.

Charles Dupuis, François de Poilly, Pierre Imbert Drevet, Étienne Baudet and others reproduced many of his works as engravings.

Selected paintings

References
 Amédée Caix de Saint-Aymour, Les Boullongne : une famille d’artistes et de financiers aux XVIIe et XVIIIe siècles, Ed. Henri Laurens, Paris, 1919.
 Antoine Schnapper, Hélène Guicharnaud, Louis de Boullogne, 1654–1733, « Cahiers du dessin français » - n° 2, Ed. Galerie de Bayser, Paris, s. d., .
 Ferdinand Hoefer, Nouvelle Biographie générale'', t. 7, Paris, Firmin-Didot, 1857, p. 13-4.

External links 
 Louis de Boullogne on Joconde.

1654 births
1733 deaths
17th-century French painters
French male painters
18th-century French painters
Prix de Rome for painting
18th-century French male artists